Peter Vaughan-Clarke (born 11 June 1957, in Wandsworth, London) is a British actor.

Vaughan-Clarke is best known for his portrayal of Stephen Jameson in the TV series The Tomorrow People in the 1970s, a character he returned to later in life in the audio continuation of the series by Big Finish Productions, most notably in the episode "Trigonometry".  He has also appeared on TV in The Pallisers, Shoestring (as "Fred"),  The Duchess of Duke Street (as "Jamie"), and appeared in the 1975 British film It Could Happen to You (aka Intimate Teenage Secrets), along with his Tomorrow People co-star Nicholas Young.

No longer regularly acting, he now works as a lighting technician and key grip.

External links

 Peter Vaughan-Clarke Interview

1957 births
Living people
Male actors from London
English male child actors
20th-century English male actors
English male television actors